The Federal College of Agriculture, Ishiagu (popularly known as "FCA Ishiagu") is based in Ishiagu, Ivo Local government area of Ebonyi State, Nigeria. The college promotes education, training and research into agricultural production, processing and technology.

History
The college which was established in Umudike in 1955 by the government of Eastern Nigeria, was amalgamated with the Agricultural Research Station, Umudike in 1964 and was taken over by the East Central State Government in 1970.
In 1972 the Federal Government took over the college as part of the Federal Agricultural Research and Training Station (FARTS), and in 1976 the school became the training wing of the National Root Crops Research Institute, Umudike. 
The National Board for Technical Education accredited the college programs in 1989, and again in 1993. The college was relocated to its current site in 1995. The site itself had been started in 1964 as a "Village Agricultural Improvement Project" for 15 villages in Olokoro Clan.

Courses 
Federal College of Agriculture Ishiagu, was only awarding National Diplomas(ND) but have recently upgraded to the award of Higher National Diplomas(HND). The following programmes are run by the institution at the National Diploma level and Higher Diploma level;

National diploma 
 Science Laboratory Technology
 Fisheries Technology
 Home and Rural Economics
 Agricultural Technology 
Agricultural and Bio-Environmental Engineering Technology 
Business Administration and Management 
Accountancy 
Marketing 
Public Administration 
Horticultural Technology 
Statistics 
Animal Health and Production Technology 
Co-operative Economics and Management 
Environmental Management Technology

Higher national diploma 
These are programmes for the award of Higher National Diploma; 

 Animal Production Technology 
 Crop Production Technology 
 Agricultural Extension and Management 
 Pest Management Technology 
Horticulture and Landscape Technology 
Fisheries Technology 
Computer Science Technology 
Home and Rural Economics 
Agricultural and Environmental Engineering Technology (Farm Power and Machinery option) 
Cooperative Economics and Management 
Statistics

See also
List of polytechnics in Nigeria

References

External links 
http://www.fcaishiagu.edu.ng/

https://www.devex.com/organizations/national-root-crops-research-institute-141699

Federal universities of Nigeria
Education in Ebonyi State
1955 establishments in Nigeria
Agricultural universities and colleges in Nigeria
Educational institutions established in 1955